Li Ao (also spelled Lee Ao; 25 April 1935 – 18 March 2018) was a Chinese writer, social commentator, historian and independent politician based in Taiwan.

Li has been called one of the most important modern East Asian essayists today; his critics have called him as an intellectual narcissist. He was a vocal critic of both the main political parties in Taiwan today, the Kuomintang and the Democratic Progressive Party. Li rejected being labeled "Pan-Blue" because of his opposition to the Kuomintang. He was given much media exposure in Taiwan due to his popularity as a writer.

Background
Li was born in Harbin, Manchukuo to Li Dingyi (李鼎彝), a professor of Chinese, and Zhang Kuichen. His family had ancestry in Wei County (modern-day Weifang), Shandong Province, and Fuyu County, Jilin Province. When Li was two years old, the family moved to Beijing, where Li's father worked in the government's opium suppression bureau.  There, Li's father was accused of being a traitor to the Kuomintang by his superiors.  Although his father was cleared of the accusations, Li began feeling enmity towards the party. The entire Li family, except for two children, moved to Taiwan at the end of the Chinese Civil War in 1949. Li received his bachelor's degree from National Taiwan University's Department of History in 1959.

Dissident writer
Li was credited for his contributions to the democratic movement in Taiwan between the 1960s and 1980s. In the 1960s, he was the editor-in-chief of Wenxing (文星), a magazine that promoted democracy and personal freedom. He was jailed by the Kuomintang government from 1971 to 1976,  for helping a pro-Taiwan independence legal scholar, Peng Ming-min, escape to Japan in 1970; even though Li himself had a long history of being an advocate of reunification. Li was also imprisoned from 1981 to 1982 over a dispute with a former employer.

Throughout the 1970s, Li received much international attention for his imprisonment. He was highlighted by Amnesty International as one of the three most important political prisoners in Taiwan in 1974.

After his release, Li continued to publish articles in magazines and newspapers, criticizing the Kuomintang government. Ninety-six of his books were banned in Taiwan until 1991. In the 1980s he also sponsored numerous anti-Kuomintang magazines.

His novel Mountaintop Love, about a mother and a daughter who fall in love with the same man, though several years apart, established Li's status as a prominent novelist. His novel Martyrs' Shrine: The Story of the Reform Movement of 1898 in China (北京法源寺), is about the beginning and the failure of the Hundred Days' Reform. Li also published his autobiography in 2001, revealing more than ten of his romantic affairs.  The bulk of his work, however, is non-fiction and consists mainly of essays and historical commentaries.

Entry into politics
Li participated in the presidential election in 2000 as a candidate for the New Party. Li usually played the role of a political gadfly, and his campaign was largely symbolic. He took the election as an opportunity to "educate" the people of Taiwan. Both Li and his party publicly encouraged people to vote for James Soong. During the presidential debates, Li even stated that he was not planning to vote for himself and that people should vote for Soong.

Since the 2000 presidential election, Li had bitterly spoken out against pro-independence Nobel laureate Yuan T. Lee, who publicly supported Chen Shui-bian. He also accused former President Lee Teng-hui of corruption. In October 2004, Li ran in the December 11 legislative election as a non-partisan candidate of the South Taipei constituency, and was subsequently elected to be the last winning place. He took office as an independent legislator on 1 February 2005.

In February 2005, Li held a press conference, accusing the PFP leader, James Soong of having changed his opposition towards military weapons purchase from the United States under the influence of people of pro-American inclination, people with CIA backgrounds and arms traders who would receive kick-backs. Li threatened Soong that he would reveal the names of the people with CIA backgrounds, who were influencing Soong, to the general public unless Soong reverted to his previous opposition position. PFP legislators dismissed the accusation and responded that Li Ao should reveal his evidence to support his story.

Later that year, in June, Li claimed to the Taiwanese press that he had exclusive information from the CIA concerning the 3-19 shooting incident. He alleged that the real motive of the killer was to assassinate the Vice-President Annette Lu in order to garner sympathy votes for Chen Shui-bian, and that the killer had been condoned by the governing party for ulterior political reasons.  After flashing several allegedly CIA-endorsed documents to reporters, he mailed them to Annette Lu, claiming that she needed to know the truth about the assassination attempt to the full extent.

On 19 September 2005, Li returned to Mainland China for the first time in 56 years. He was invited to give speeches at Peking University, Tsinghua University and Fudan University where he was warmly received, and the trip was claimed to have had significant impact on observers of Cross-Strait relations.

Li was a candidate for the 2006 Taipei Mayoral election, and a candidate for the 2012 Legislative Yuan elections, campaigning in Taipei City District 8 under the People First Party (PFP) banner. Li also satirized Mao Zedong's Little Red Book in his article.

On 24 October 2006, Li sprayed tear gas and wielded a stun gun during a Legislative Yuan National Defense Committee meeting, forcing several members of the parliament to flee. He was attempting to stop debate on purchasing attack submarines and Patriot anti-aircraft missiles for $16 billion from the U.S. He was also wearing the Guy Fawkes mask from V for Vendetta.

Personal life
On 6 May 1980, Li married Taiwanese writer, translator and film actress Terry Hu. Their love story even featured in Time. But the couple divorced on 28 August 1980, after 115 days in total.

On 8 March 1992, Li married his second wife, Wang Zhihui (王志慧). They had one son and one daughter together. Their son, Li Kan (李戡), is a PhD student in Chinese Studies of Cambridge and an alumnus of Peking University.

Li also had an elder daughter, Hedy W. Lee, from a previous relationship.

Li died of a brain tumor at Taipei Veterans General Hospital on 18 March 2018.

Notes

References

External links
Li Ao's Verified Weibo, at Sina.com 

1935 births
2018 deaths
National Taiwan University alumni
Members of the 6th Legislative Yuan
Taiwanese billionaires
Taiwanese male novelists
20th-century Taiwanese historians
Politicians from Harbin
Republic of China politicians from Heilongjiang
New Party (Taiwan) presidential nominees
Chinese Civil War refugees
Taiwanese people from Heilongjiang
Taipei Members of the Legislative Yuan
Anti-Americanism
Anti-Japanese sentiment in Taiwan